Llanvair railway station served the village of Llanvair Discoed, in the historical county of Monmouthshire, Wales, in 1854 on the Newport, Abergavenny and Hereford Railway.

History 
The station was opened on 2 January 1854 by the Newport, Abergavenny and Hereford Railway. It was a very short-lived station, only being open for just under nine months before closing on 1 October 1854.

References 

Railway stations in Great Britain opened in 1854
Railway stations in Great Britain closed in 1854
1854 establishments in Wales
1854 disestablishments in Wales